Mohammad Dilawar Mir is a well known Indian politician and member of the Jammu and Kashmir Apni Party. Mir was a member of the Jammu and Kashmir Legislative Assembly from the Rafiabad constituency in Baramulla district. His son Yawar Mir took over the same in 2014 becoming the youngest MLA in J&K. Dilawar Mir left Jammu and Kashmir Peoples Democratic Party in February 2020 to form Apni party.

References 

People from Baramulla district
Janata Dal politicians
Jammu & Kashmir National Conference politicians
Jammu and Kashmir Peoples Democratic Party politicians
Living people
21st-century Indian politicians
Year of birth missing (living people)
Jammu and Kashmir MLAs 1977–1983
Jammu and Kashmir MLAs 1983–1986
Jammu and Kashmir MLAs 1996–2002
Jammu and Kashmir MLAs 2002–2008